Thomas William Hall (1861 – 12 June 1937) was a British Solicitor and philatelist who signed the Roll of Distinguished Philatelists in 1921.

References

British philatelists
1861 births
1937 deaths
Signatories to the Roll of Distinguished Philatelists
Presidents of the Royal Philatelic Society London
British solicitors